The Chesley Award for Best Cover Illustration - Magazine Art is given by the Association of Science Fiction and Fantasy Artists (ASFA) to recognize achievements in the illustration of science fiction & fantasy magazines eligible in the year previous to the award.

Winners and nominees

References

External links
 The Chesley Award section of the ASFA website

Cover Illustration Magazine
Science fiction awards